Grallipeza nebulosa is a species of stilt-legged flies in the family Micropezidae.

References

Further reading

External links

 
 

Micropezidae
Insects described in 1866